Guadix Cathedral, Cathedral of Guadix, or Cathedral of the Incarnation is a Roman Catholic church in Guadix, province of Granada, Spain. Construction of the building began in the 16th century and was completed in the mid-18th century. It is in the Baroque style.

Location and historical context
Guadix is believed to be one of the oldest diocesan seats in Spain; tradition has it that the diocese was founded by Saint Torquatus of Acci in the first century A.D. The cathedral sits on the site of an earlier Hispano-Visigothic church extant in the 10th century, and which functioned during the Islamic period as a mosque.

During the Reconquista, Guadix was captured by the Christian forces in 1489, and the Hispano-Visigothic church was reestablished as the seat of a bishopric. It was given the name of the Church of Saint Mary of the Incarnation (Iglesia de Santa María de la Encarnación), was made a cathedral by a bull of Pope Innocent VIII, and was somewhat expanded under the direction of Pedro de Morales.

Plans were made to replace the old church with a Gothic cathedral as a symbol of the Reconquista, but by the time construction began, that style was already considered antiquated. Cardinal Ávalos and others wanted a cathedral more in accord with the style of the times. Diego de Siloé was commissioned in 1549 to develop a design reflecting the influence of the cathedrals of Málaga and Granada. The apse, part of the crossing, the chapel of Don Tadeo and parte part of the sacristy were completed according to Siloé's plan.

Construction 

Besides Siloé, Francisco Roldán, Francisco Antero, and others were involved in designing the new cathedral. Siloé planned the main chapel in a Renaissance style, with an alternation of straight lines and curves, with profuse decoration in the classical style and highly developed entablature. 
The Freyla brothers, Pedro and Miguel, worked many years on a tower intended as an emblem of identity for the city.

In 1574, work stopped for lack of money, and was not resumed until 1594, when Bishop Juan de Fonseca y Guzmán resumed the project.

The work received a new impulse at the end of the 17th century and beginning of the 18th with economic assistance from the king. Blas Antonio Delgado was placed in charge of the new plans, with changes in the design giving more emphasis to horizontal lines. Delgado laid out the general design of the cathedral, the elevations, the doors and the cupola, but in 1714 had to move to Jaén. Vicente Acero took over, reworking the plan extensively, before also having to move on. The city government approached Francisco de Hurtado Izquierdo; rather than take on the project himself, he recommended Gaspar Cayón de la Vega. The strong imprint of Cayón de la Vega can be seen in the latter stages of construction of the building, in the vaulting, the dome, and in the portada de las Azucenas—the front portion of the building, utilizing a motif of lilies—which Acero had begun.

When Cayón de la Vega left for Cádiz in 1731, the façade was under construction according to his plans, but others such as Vicente Acero, Pachote, and Thomas added pieces that were not in Cayón's plan.

Characteristics 

The chapel of Don Tadeo shows strong Italian structural influences in its solution to the problem of vaulting arches within a cylindrical structure. Another notable element is the front of the sacristy, with its Renaissance pediment, its entablature, and the arch between Corinthian columns with the coats of arms of the bishops of the city.

The façade is a splendid example of the Baroque architecture, with two massed bodies and a pinnacle, with alternating concave and convex lines; the large central span, flanked by two lintels composed of groups of broad-based columns. The upper part was realized by Fernández Pachote and Domingo Thomas; Antonio Valeriano Moyano sculpted the marble Incarnation.

References

Guadix
Province of Granada
Baroque architecture in Andalusia
Churches in Andalusia